Tom Burton  (born 27 June 1990) is an Australian competitive sailor. He won the gold medal at the 2016 Summer Olympics in Rio de Janeiro in the men's Laser class. He was awarded an Order of Australia Medal in 2017.

In 2016 Burton was named as the Australian Sailing Male Sailor of the Year Award in Sydney. 

Burton won the 2019 Laser Standard Men's World Championship in Sakaiminoto, Japan.

References

External links
 
 
 
 

1990 births
Living people
Australian male sailors (sport)
Olympic sailors of Australia
Olympic gold medalists for Australia
Olympic medalists in sailing
Sailors at the 2016 Summer Olympics – Laser
Medalists at the 2016 Summer Olympics
Recipients of the Medal of the Order of Australia
21st-century Australian people